Davydchi is a rural locality (a village) in Dubrovsky District, Bryansk Oblast, Russia. The population was 435 as of 2010. There are 6 streets.

Geography 
Davydchi is located 3 km southwest of Dubrovka (the district's administrative centre) by road. Ponizovka is the nearest rural locality.

References 

Rural localities in Dubrovsky District